"Train Of Thought" is the second single released by an American singer/actress Cher from her 1974 album Dark Lady. It reached number #27 on the Billboard Hot 100 and #9 on the Adult Contemporary chart. Allmusic retrospectively described this song as "raw and fast-moving rock." In 1976, the song was covered by an American singer-songwriter and musician Gene Pitney.

Weekly Charts

References

1974 singles
Cher songs
Songs written by Alan O'Day
Song recordings produced by Snuff Garrett
1974 songs
Articles containing video clips
American rock songs